Razoo may refer to:
 Brass razoo, an Australian term
 Razoo, Iran, a village in Hormozgan Province, Iran